Lasionycta haida is a moth of the family Noctuidae. It is endemic to Haida Gwaii in British Columbia.

The wingspan is 32–33 mm.

External links
A Revision of Lasionycta Aurivillius (Lepidoptera, Noctuidae) for North America and notes on Eurasian species, with descriptions of 17 new species, 6 new subspecies, a new genus, and two new species of Tricholita Grote

Lasionycta
Moths described in 2009